Danzell Orlando Marcelino Gravenberch (born 13 February 1994) is a Dutch professional footballer who plays as a striker for Karmiotissa.

Club career

Ajax
Born in Amsterdam, Gravenberch began playing football in the youth ranks of local amateur side SV Bijlmer, from where he was recruited to join the Ajax Academy in 2002. Gravenberch helped the Ajax A1 youth squad win the 2011–12 Nike Eredivisie league title. The team finished as runners-up to Inter Milan in the NextGen Series (the Champions League equivalent for under-20 teams) after losing on penalties (5–3) following a 1–1 deadlock after extra time.

On 7 June 2012, it was announced that Gravenberch had signed his first professional contract, a three-year deal binding him to the club until 30 June 2015. Gravenberch began his career in the youth teams of Ajax as a striker, but was moved back to play as a defender while playing for Jong Ajax under manager Fred Grim in the 2012–13 Beloften Eredivisie. Jong Ajax were promoted to the Eerste Divisie, the second tier of professional football in the Netherlands, for the 2013–14 season. Gravenberch made his professional debut in a 2–0 away loss to FC Oss in the Eerste Divisie on 8 August 2013. He was cautioned before being replaced by Sven Nieuwpoort on 46 minutes.

NEC (loan)
On 17 January 2014, it was announced that Gravenberch had been sent on loan to NEC until the end of the season.

Universitatea Cluj
On 4 September 2014, it was announced that Gravenberch had signed with Romanian club Universitatea Cluj. The move came after an unsuccessful trial period with Scottish Premiership side Dundee. Gravenberch signed a 2-year contract with U Cluj, reuniting him with his former coach and now technical director of the club Alfons Groenendijk, as well as newly appointed manager and former Ajax player George Ogăraru. He made his Liga I debut on 14 September 2014 in an away match against FC Rapid București which ended in a 2–1 loss.

FC Dordrecht
On 24 June 2015 it was announced that Gravenberch had returned to the Netherlands, signing with the recently relegated FC Dordrecht, competing in the Eerste Divisie.

Reading
On 25 May 2016 Reading announced the signing of Gravenberch on a three-year contract, the deal was then officially completed when the transfer window opened on 1 July 2016.
On 23 August 2016 Gravenberch made his competitive debut vs MK Dons in the EFL Cup. He made his league debut as a late substitute against Aston Villa on 18 October 2016. In October 2016, Gravenberch was criticized by Arsenal manager, Arsene Wenger, for a challenge on Lucas Perez, which left the Arsenal striker out for at least 6 weeks.

On 4 July 2017, Gravenberch moved to Belgian First Division B club Roeselare for two seasons on loan. However, he was injured throughout his first season with Roesleare.

He was released by Reading at the end of the 2018–19 season.

Return to the Netherlands
In September 2019, Gravenberch joined Eerste Divisie club TOP Oss. After an unfortunate first half of the season, in which he failed to score and was also utilised as a centre-back, he left the club again. Gravenberch would play the remainder of the season at his former club Dordrecht.

In June 2020, Sparta Rotterdam picked up Gravenberch from Dordrecht one a one-year deal. However, he also failed to succeed there, as he mostly appeared as a substitute. On 30 March 2021, it was announced that his contract would not be extended.

In May 2021, Gravenberch signed a two-year contract with De Graafschap.

International career
Gravenberch has played for the Netherlands at various youth levels. On 6 February 2010, he received his first U-16 cap in a match against Italy at the Albufeira 4 Nations Tournament in Portugal.

On 17 September 2010, Gravenberch made his U-17 debut in another encounter with Italy during the Ursapharm-Vier-Nationen-Turnier in Germany. The following year, he was selected by Albert Stuivenberg to play in the 2012 UEFA European Under-17 Championship, where he helped the Netherlands to their second consecutive title, defeating Germany in the final 5–4 on penalties, after extra time following a 1–1 deadlock. Gravenberch was also selected for the 2011 FIFA U-17 World Cup in Mexico where he scored his first goal in the second group stage match against North Korea. He appeared in all three group stage matches, of which they managed one victory, a draw and a loss resulting in an early exit from the tournament for the Dutch.

On 11 November 2011, Gravenberch made his U-18 debut in a friendly match against Romania. His U-19 debut came in a friendly match against Scotland on 10 September 2012. He was selected by U-19 head coach Wim van Zwam for the 2013 UEFA European Under-19 Championship in Lithuania, appearing in all three group stage matches before being eliminated following one win and two losses.

Personal life
Gravenberch is of Surinamese descent. His younger brother, Ryan Gravenberch, is also a professional footballer.

Career statistics

Honours

Club
Ajax A1 (under-19)
 A-Junioren Eredivisie: 2011–12
 NextGen Series Runner-up: 2011–12

Universitatea Cluj
 Cupa României Runner-up: 2014–15

International
Netherlands U-17
 UEFA European Under-17 Football Championship (1): 2011

References

External links
 Voetbal International profile 
 
 Netherlands U19 stats at OnsOranje
 
 

1994 births
Living people
Dutch footballers
Netherlands youth international footballers
Association football defenders
Dutch sportspeople of Surinamese descent
Footballers from Amsterdam
AFC Ajax players
NEC Nijmegen players
FC Dordrecht players
Reading F.C. players
FC Universitatea Cluj players
K.S.V. Roeselare players
TOP Oss players
Sparta Rotterdam players
De Graafschap players
Eredivisie players
Eerste Divisie players
English Football League players
Liga I players
Challenger Pro League players
Dutch expatriate footballers
Expatriate footballers in Romania
Expatriate footballers in England
Expatriate footballers in Belgium
Dutch expatriate sportspeople in Romania
Dutch expatriate sportspeople in England
Dutch expatriate sportspeople in Belgium